A list of films released in Japan in 1971 (see 1971 in film).

See also
1971 in Japan
1971 in Japanese television

Footnotes

References

External links
Japanese films of 1971 at the Internet Movie Database

1971
Japanese
Films